Cassandra Giraldo (born May 4, 1989) is a photojournalist, documentary cinematographer, and producer based in Brooklyn, New York.

She was staff producer and cinematographer on Vice News Tonight on HBO from 2016 to 2020.

Early life and education 
Cassandra Giraldo was born in 1989 in Los Angeles, California. Her parents are of Mexican-American and Colombian descent. Giraldo received her bachelor's degree in International Affairs and French from Skidmore College in 2011.  In 2012, she completed the Photojournalism & Documentary Studies Program at the International Center of Photography. While in the Photojournalism & Documentary Studies program, she began The After School Project. After working for four years as a freelance photographer, she began her studies at the Toni Stabile Center for Investigative Journalism at Columbia University Graduate School of Journalism, graduating in 2017.

Photography exhibits 

 The GentlePunks, Giraldo follows a group of teenage punks in St. Petersburg, Russia avoiding intimidation by the police.
 The After School Project: Is a series of photojournalistic images that documents the after school lives of New York City youth.  Inspired by a Brooklyn teen shooting, Giraldo wanted to highlight and contrast the intimate and playful way teens spent their afternoons, navigated a complex and unfriendly world.  The series was a project featured on Instagram beginning in 2011 and garnered Giraldo recognition from the Getty Institute where she was and exception finalist in 2015.
 Chutanacuy: photo documentary of a Peruvian small town in Ollantaytambo which documents the local traditions performed in honor of carnival.  Chutanacuy is a tradition where teams dress themselves in traditional clothes to complete a tug-of-war.  The winning team will harvest the tree of gifts at the edge of town.

Awards 

 Giraldo was a member of the Vice Media Group recognized with an Emmy award for Outstanding Coverage of a Breaking News Story in a Newscast as part of the newsroom's team coverage of the George Floyd protests across the U.S. 
2016 Chosen Winner, American Photography 32: Photograph of the Brooklyn Technical High School football team from the series "The After School Project".
 2016 Finalist, Lucie Emerging Scholarship.
 National Press Photographers Association 2016 Bob Baxter Scholarship Winner.
 Named one of 30 Under 30 Women Photographers by Photo Boite in 2016.
2015: Exceptional finalist in Getty Images inaugural Instagram grant.

References 

Wikipedia Student Program
1989 births
Living people
American cinematographers
American photojournalists
American women photographers
Columbia University Graduate School of Journalism alumni
American women journalists
American documentary filmmakers
Women photojournalists